Joseph E. Canciamilla (born April 19, 1955) is a Democratic politician who represented California's 11th State Assembly district from December 4, 2000 to November 30, 2006.  Canciamilla retired as the Contra Costa County Clerk-Recorder on October 31, 2019.

Early life and political career
Canciamilla was born on April 19, 1955 in Pittsburg, California. He graduated Pittsburg High School, St. Mary's College and John F. Kennedy University College of Law.

First elected to the Pittsburg Board of Education at the age of 17, Joe was the youngest elected official in the nation. After serving almost 4 terms on the school board, Canciamilla moved on to the Pittsburg City Council where he served over two terms, including two years as Mayor. He was elected to the Contra Costa County Board of Supervisors in 1996 and to the State Assembly in 2000 serving the 11th Assembly District.

In July 2021, Canciamilla pleaded guilty to nine counts of perjury and grand theft. He was sentenced to one year's home detention, which he is serving in his beachfront condo on Kauai, Hawaii.

Political Accomplishments

In his first term in the Assembly, Canciamilla enacted legislation to protect investors from fraudulent and deceptive "Enron-like" partnerships, provide better security options for Animal Control Officers, and expand more energy options for California businesses.

During his second term, Canciamilla wanted to encourage more constructive dialogue and cooperation between Democratic and Republican legislators, therefore, he and Assemblymember Keith Richman, a Republican from Northridge organized the 27 member Bi-Partisan Group which regularly met to discuss policy issues.

Personal life
Canciamilla has experience in the private sector as co-owner of Pittsburg Funeral Chapel, Inc., a family-owned business for over 50 years, and as an attorney who maintained a practice for over 10 years. He is married to a doctor named Laura Stephenson.

References

County supervisors in California
Living people
Democratic Party members of the California State Assembly
Saint Mary's College of California alumni
John F. Kennedy University College of Law alumni
School board members in California
21st-century American politicians
1955 births
People from Pittsburg, California